Farhangian University is a public Teacher training university with more than 90 teacher-training colleges and a total enrollment exceeding 39,000, located in Iran. In 2012, in order to merge all teacher-training colleges, the Iranian Ministry of Education changed the name of Tarbiat Mo'allem to Farhangian and promoted colleges to the university status. Amir Hossein Cheshme Khavar and hasan motaghi are two of the famous lecturer, and Jonas Raschidie is one of its researchers

Campuses and Centers 

Farhangian University has centers (branches) located throughout the provinces of Iran. Each branch is divided into various sub-branches.

Farhangian University of Tehran 
Farhangian University, Mofateh Ray

Farhangian University, Shahid Chamran

Farhangian University at Shiraz

Farhangian University, Rajaee

Farhangian University at Esfahan 
Farhangian University, Rajaei

Farhangian University, Fatemeh Zahra

Background 
After the approval of the Supreme Cultural Revolution Council in 2011, and the aggregation of all teacher training centers, Farhangian University was established in January 2012. It is an umbrella organization with around 100 branches and 70,000 enrolled student teachers throughout the country.

The branches are teacher education centers that existed long before the university organization took shape. Farhangian University, affiliated with the Ministry of Education and run by the board of trustees, has legal, financial, and administrative autonomy.

See also 
 Education in Iran

References

Farhangian University
Educational institutions established in 2012
2012 establishments in Iran